is a Japanese footballer currently playing as a defender for Vegalta Sendai.

Playing career 
Right-back good at attacking. At Hannan University, he served as captain.

Career statistics

Club
.

Notes

References

External links
Profile at Vegalta Sendai

 
 

1998 births
Living people
Japanese footballers
Association football defenders
Hannan University alumni
J1 League players
Vegalta Sendai players